is a 2009 Japanese animated action fantasy film based on the Pretty Cure franchise created by Izumi Todo. The film is directed by Takashi Otsuka, written by Isao Murayama, and produced by Toei Animation. The film was released in Japan on March 20, 2009.

Marking the very first installment to the Pretty Cure All Stars crossover film series, as well as the fifth anniversary to the franchise overall, the Futari wa Pretty Cure Max Heart, Futari wa Pretty Cure Splash Star, Yes! PreCure 5 GoGo! and Fresh Pretty Cure! teams join forces to defeat a monster named Fusion.

Plot
The Fresh Pretty Cure! team: Love, Miki and Inori head to the dance contest being held in Minato Mirai 21 in Yokohama, but suddenly attacked by a creature named Fusion, formed by remnants of Zakennas, Uzainas, Kowainas, and Hoshinas. They transform and fight the creature, but leaves in the middle of a fight as they lack power. In Palmier Kingdom, as the fairies Coco and Nutts explains the usage of the Rainbow Miracle Lights, Tart bursts in and tries to warn them about Fusion, but realizes that it followed him to the castle. In a frantic chaos, they all run away and separated from another.

Lulun falls from the sky, and meets the Yes! PreCure 5 GoGo! team: Nozomi, Rin, Urara, Komachi, Karen and Kurumi, who realizes that she was being chased by a fragment of Fusion, they transform and fight. However, it absorbs their attacks and runs off. Moop and Foop ends up with the Futari wa Pretty Cure Max Heart team: Nagisa, Honoka, and Hikari, where same thing happens to them as Fusion absorbs their attacks, and later with the Futari wa Pretty Cure Splash Star team: Saki and Mai, as they're protecting Coco, Nutts, and Syrup. Meanwhile, Love and the others tries to search for Chiffon, who've gone missing. The fragments of Fusion reunites in the sky, and spreads the darkness around the city. As Cures Peach, Berry and Pine demands Fusion where it took Chiffon, it fights and overpowers them, and traps the Cures in the pool of darkness. Determined to reunite the fairies to their respective partners, the Max Heart, Splash Star and Yes! 5 teams makes their way to the city and fights off their respective monsters. As Fresh team pulls themselves out of the pool, a light shatters the dark dome and notices three Pretty Cure teams surrounding them.

Angered, Fusion turns into a gigantic monster and attacks them. Refusing to give up, the Pretty Cures engage in a long fight, and as they're about to be defeated, Chiffon appears with the Rainbow Miracle Lights and sends to every mascot. With its power, the Cures combine their attacks and destroys Fusion, restoring the city back to normal. Later at the dance competition, Love, Miki and Inori nervously dance and fails as the other girls are watching them, but accepts their slip-ups.

Voice cast
Fresh Pretty Cure! cast
 Kanae Oki as Love Momozono/Cure Peach
Eri Kitamura as Miki Aono/Cure Berry
Akiko Nakagawa as Inori Yamabuki/Cure Pine
Taiki Matsuno as Tart
Satomi Kōrogi as Chiffon

Yes! PreCure 5 GoGo! cast
Yūko Sanpei as Nozomi Yumehara/Cure Dream
Junko Takeuchi as Rin Natsuki/Cure Rouge
Mariya Ise as Urara Kasugano/Cure Lemonade
Ai Nagano as Komachi Akimoto/Cure Mint
Ai Maeda as Karen Minazuki/Cure Aqua
Eri Sendai as Milk/Kurumi Mimino/Milky Rose
Takeshi Kusao as Coco
Miyu Irino as Natts
Romi Park as Syrup
Chihiro Sakurai as Kowaina
Shinya Fukumatsu as Hoshina

Futari wa Pretty Cure Splash Star cast
Orie Kimoto as Saki Hyuuga/Cure Bloom/Cure Bright
Atsuko Enomoto as Mai Mishou/Cure Egret/Cure Windy
Kappei Yamaguchi as Flappy
Miyu Matsuki as Choppy
Yuriko Fuchizaki as Moop
Akemi Okamura as Fuup
Hideo Watanabe as Uzaina

Futari wa Pretty Cure Max Heart cast
Yōko Honna as Nagisa Misumi/Cure Black
Yukana as Honoka Yukishiro/Cure White
Rie Tanaka as Hikari Kujo/Shiny Luminous
Tomokazu Seki as Mepple
Akiko Yajima as Mipple
Haruna Ikezawa as Pollun
Asuka Tanii as Lulun
Satoshi Taki as Zakenna

Film character
Takehito Koyasu as Fusion

Production
In February 2009, it was announced that a crossover feature film of the Pretty Cure film was in the works, featuring Futari wa Pretty Cure Max Heart, Futari wa Pretty Cure Splash Star, Yes! PreCure 5 GoGo!, and its current series, Fresh Pretty Cure!. The film will be directed by Takashi Otsuka at Toei Animation, Isao Murayama providing the screenplay, and Pretty Cure episode animation director Mitsuru Aoyama is providing the character designs and animation direction for the film.

Release
The film was released in theaters in Japan on March 20, 2009.

Reception

Box office
The film opened at number 5 out of top 10 in the Japanese box office in its opening weekend, and later fell to number 10 in its final weekend.

Notes

References

External links
 

2000s Japanese films
2009 anime films
Pretty Cure films
Toei Animation films
Japanese magical girl films
Crossover anime and manga
Films scored by Naoki Satō
Films scored by Yasuharu Takanashi
Films set in Yokohama